Sodo or Wolaita Sodo or (Wolaytatto: Wolayta Sodo Ambbaa) is a city in south-central Ethiopia. The administrative center of the Wolaita Zone. It was part of the former Sodo woreda which included Sodo Zuria which completely surrounds it.

Sodo is a center of major health and education institutions in Ethiopia. Soddo Christian Hospital has one of the 10 surgical training centers in Africa. The hospital provides a full range of medical, and surgical services, including Orthopedic and General, Maternity, and Pediatrics.  Wolaita Sodo University Teaching Referral Hospital is also located in this town and it serves around two million people. The total number of beds in the hospital was 200; out of which 60 beds were in Obstetrics and Gynecology department.

Sodo's amenities include digital and mobile telephone access, postal service, 24-hour electrical service, two banks, and a hospital. Sodo is also the seat of the Roman Catholic Apostolic Vicariate of Sodo-Hosaena.

History 
In the early 1930s, Sodo was described as the only locality in Wolaita district deserving to be called a town. It had a Saturday market, a telephone line to the capital, and a weekly mail courier. Italian ground troops captured Sodo on 27 January 1937; it was there that two Italian generals with their divisions – Liberati with his 25th Division, and Bacarri with his 101st Division – surrendered on 22 May 1941, after a minimum of resistance. The British also captured the remnants of the 21st Division, who had escaped around the north end of Lake Abijatta. The loot included more than 4,000 officers and men, 6 medium tanks, 4 light tanks, 100 machine guns, ammunition and supplies.

By 1958 Sodo was one of 27 places in Ethiopia ranked as First Class Township. A branch of the Commercial Bank of Ethiopia was established between 1965-68.  The administrator of Sodo Zuria woreda and one-time student activist, Melaku Gebre Egziahber, was arrested in 1975 for encouraging peasants and the urban poor to rise up against "exploiters" in the town. In 1984, a refugee camp was established in the town for the victims of that year's famine.

On 6 November 1999, police arrested two teachers in Sodo for objecting to the use of a new language in school textbooks. Student demonstrations against the arrests led to widespread week-long protests and riots. Special police units were brought in to suppress the demonstrations, and killed as many as 10 people, injured hundreds and arrested up to 1,000 others. A former YMCA camp outside Sodo was used as a temporary detention facility for hundreds of demonstrators.

Prior to the Ethiopian 2005 General Elections, Amnesty International reports that some members of the United Ethiopian Democratic Forces political party were amongst 200 people reportedly detained under vagrancy laws in Sodo on 22 February 2005. Amnesty International included this incident as one of a series of government intimidation of opposition party activists.

Demographics 
Based on the 2007 Census conducted by the CSA, this town has a total population of 76,050, of whom 40,140 are men and 35,910 women. The majority of the inhabitants were Protestants, with 54.60% of the population reporting that belief, 38.43% practiced Ethiopian Orthodox Christianity, 4.76% were Muslim, and 1.28% were Catholic.
 The 1994 national census reported this town had a total population of 36,287 of whom 18,863 were men and 17,424 were women.

Education 
Established in 2007, Wolaita Sodo University (WSU) is a non-profit public higher education institution located in Sodo. WSU offers courses and programs leading to officially recognized higher education degrees in several areas of study. The university has campuses in different areas, including Dawuro Tarcha Campus. The city has numerous secondary schools of which the prominent ones are Wolaita Sodo Secondary & preparatory school and Wolita Liqa School.

Transportation
Sodo is served by an airport. A  road connecting Sodo with Chida, whose construction had started in 1994, was completed by early 1999. According to the SNNPR's Bureau of Finance and Economic Development,

Sport 
Wolaitta Dicha S.C. is an Ethiopian football club based in Sodo. The club now is playing premier league which is first level division. The club won its first domestic cup in 2017, and qualified for the 2018 CAF Confederation Cup, in which the club beat Zamalek SC and passed to the quarter-final.

Sodo Kenema S.C. is an Ethiopian football club based in Sodo. The club now is playing super league which is second level division.

Wolaita Sodo University women's volleyball club is also based in this city. The club was established in 2020 and it was founded by Debrework Tesfaye and his colleagues teaching in Wolaita Sodo University department of Sport Science. The club won the Ethiopian Volleyball Federation knockout tournament in the same year and automatically qualified for CAVB women's club championship in 2021.  The club also finished the league as a runner up in the same season. The club then won Ethiopian Women's Volleyball premier League in 2022.

Climate
Located in the tropics at high altitude, Sodo possesses a well-moderated Subtropical highland climate (Koppen Cwb), with a pronounced pattern of wet summers and dry winters. Despite being located in the Northern Hemisphere, Sodo is actually cooler in the "summer" than the "winter" due to much higher rainfall in the high-sun season, a phenomenon common to Sodo's region.

Notable people 
 Samuel Urkato, Minister of Science and Higher Education, Ethiopia.

 Hailemariam Desalegn, former Prime Minister of Ethiopia who served from August 2012 until April 2018. He previously occupied the positions of Deputy Prime Minister and Minister of Foreign Affairs; Minister of Social Affairs and Government Chief- Whip Minister. He was also Governor of the Southern Regional State for six years.
 Gildo kassa, is Ethiopian record producer, songwriter, and singer.
 Kamuzu kassa, is Ethiopian music composer and songwriter.

References

Sodo
Wolayita
Populated places in the Southern Nations, Nationalities, and Peoples' Region
Cities and towns in Wolayita Zone
Ethiopia
Cities and towns in Ethiopia